Kevin Connor (born 14 July 1937) is an English film and television director based in Hollywood.

Biography
Connor was born in Kings Cross, London on 14 July 1937. He left school in 1953, first working on documentary films in Soho. Later, he became a sound editor on several British productions, working with directors such as Tony Richardson, Richard Attenborough, Richard Lester, Abraham Polonsky and Michael Cacoyannis. Connor worked as an editor on Oh! What a Lovely War in 1969, and was eventually given his directing break with From Beyond the Grave in 1974, thanks to producer Milton Subotsky of Amicus Productions. 

He is best remembered for directing 1970s fantasy/adventure films such as The Land That Time Forgot (1974), At the Earth's Core (1976), The People That Time Forgot (1977), Warlords of Atlantis (1979) and Arabian Adventure (1979).

Connor has also directed other films such as Trial by Combat (1976), Motel Hell (1980), The House Where Evil Dwells (1982), Sunset Grill (1993) and Domestic Import (2006), as well as many TV miniseries and films, including Goliath Awaits, North and South: Book II, The Return of Sherlock Holmes, Great Expectations, Diana: Her True Story, Liz: The Elizabeth Taylor Story, Mother Teresa: In the Name of God's Poor, In the Beginning, Frankenstein, Blackbeard and Marco Polo.

References

External links

1937 births
Living people
English film directors
English television directors